Ponhea Yat (c. 1390 – 1463), also known as Borom Reachea II, was the last king of the Khmer Empire and the first king of Cambodia.

Ponhea Yat complained to the Yongle Emperor in 1408 and 1414 of raids by the Champa King Indravarman VI. He dispatched Kun Si-li Ren-nong-la to visit China.

He was forced to flee Yasodharapura in 1431 as it was indefensible against attack by the Siamese, resettling first in Basan (Srey Santhor), but after it became flooded, fled to Chaktomuk (now part of Phnom Penh).

In Phnom Penh, the king ordered the land to be built up to protect it from flooding, and a palace to be built.  During his reign he also ordered the construction of six Buddhist monasteries around the city, and his remains are housed in a stupa behind the Wat Phnom.

King Ponhea Yat was succeeded on his death by his first son Noreay Reachea, who reigned until 1469 and who was succeeded in turn by Ponhea Yat's second son, Srey Reachea.

See also
History of Cambodia
Kings of Cambodia

References

External links 
Phnom Penh History

15th-century Cambodian monarchs
Cambodian Buddhist monarchs
Khmer Empire
1394 births
1463 deaths